Brachycephalus pombali is a species of frogs in the family Brachycephalidae. It is endemic to Brazil and only known from its type locality, "Morro dos Padres, Pico da Igreja", in the Serra do Mar in Guaratuba, Paraná state.

Etymology
The specific name pombali honors José Perez Pombal, Jr., a Brazilian herpetologist who has worked with the genus Brachycephalus.

Description
As all brachycephalids, Brachycephalus pombali are small: adult males measure  and females  in snout–vent length; this miniaturization is associated with loss of phalanges in hands and feet. The body is robust and toad-like. There is no tympanum. The general color is orange, lateral surfaces have small dark brown spots, and belly has brownish coalescent spots and small dots. The skin on top of the head and central part of the back body is smooth and without dermal co-ossification, whereas the skin on dorso-lateral surfaces of body, flanks, and dorsal surface of thighs is granular.

Habitat and conservation
Brachycephalus pombali inhabit the leaf litter in the Atlantic Rainforest. They are active by day. Adult males are exposed on the litter when calling. There are no known threats to this species, but it is only known from a single location.

References

pombali
Endemic fauna of Brazil
Amphibians of Brazil
Frogs of South America
Amphibians described in 2006